Dmytro Pavlovych Tutychenko (born 5 March 1970) is a former Ukrainian football player.

References

1970 births
People from Izmail
Living people
Soviet footballers
Ukrainian footballers
SC Odesa players
Ukrainian Premier League players
FC Nyva Ternopil players
FC Elista players
Ukrainian expatriate footballers
Expatriate footballers in Russia
FC Dnipro players
Russian Premier League players
FC Metallurg Lipetsk players
Association football forwards
Sportspeople from Odesa Oblast